Esan Regmi (born 1988) is a prominent Nepali intersex man and intersex human rights activist. He has founded the Nepali organization Campaign for Change, and he is one of the co founders of International NGO Intersex Asia.

Early life 
Regmi was born in Bajura, Nepal, in 1988. He describes the region around Bajura as remote, mountainous, and conservative. Regmi was raised female but developed male characteristics during puberty, resulting in stigma, discrimination and claims of 'fake' identity in education and employment. He describes travelling to India for medical treatment, and discussion about being sent to be part of a kinnar or hijra community. Regmi was loved by his family, and studied at home, but his mental health suffered.

Activism 
Regmi became an intersex human rights activist in 2011, initially with Blue Diamond Society, before later establishing Campaign for Change and jointly establishing Intersex Asia. He organized and led first national workshop for intersex people in 2016, supported by the UNDP.

Regmi has worked with Blue Diamond Society and Zwischengeschlecht on submissions to the United Nations leading to calls for change to medical and social systems in Nepal. He speaks nationally and internationally on intersex rights.

Selected bibliography

References 

Living people
Intersex rights activists
Intersex rights in Nepal
Intersex men
Intersex writers
1988 births
People from Bajura District